Empress Phạm may refer to:

Phạm Thị Liên (1758–1791), wife of Quang Trung
Phạm Thị Hằng (1810–1902), wife of Thiệu Trị

Phạm